No. 10, Upping St. is the second studio album by English band Big Audio Dynamite, led by Mick Jones, the former lead guitarist and co-lead vocalist of the Clash. The album's title is a pun on 10 Downing Street, the headquarters of the Government of the United Kingdom. The album reunited Jones for one album with former Clash bandmate Joe Strummer, who was a co-producer of the album and co-writer of 5 of its 9 songs.

Album artwork
The cover painting, based on a still taken from the Brian De Palma film Scarface (1983), was painted by Tim Jones and Deirdre McArdle.

Track listing

Notes
 "Dial a Hitman" contains a spoken-word outro attributed to Matt Dillon and Laurence Fishburne (and with a reference to Jim Jarmusch)
 "C'mon Every Beatbox" was remixed and released in the US as "Badrock City"
 "C'mon Every Beatbox", "V. Thirteen", and "Sightsee M.C!" were all released as singles in the UK
 "C'mon Every Beatbox" contains samples from the films The Gang That Couldn't Shoot Straight (1971), The Harder They Come (1972), and The Cotton Club (1984)
 "Sambadrome" contains some samples from Brazilian football commentator Osmar Santos
 "Ice Cool Killer" is an instrumental version of "Limbo the Law"
 "The Big V" is an instrumental version of "V. Thirteen"
 "Badrock City" is an instrumental version of "C'mon Every Beatbox"
 "V. Thirteen" is named for the territorial tags drawn by members of Venice 13 (V13) is a Mexican-American street gang based in the Oakwood (aka "Ghost Town") neighborhood of Venice, a section of Los Angeles, California, with a substantial presence in East Venice as well as the Culver City/Los Angeles border, especially around Washington Blvd.
 Later pressings of the album substituted the original versions of "Hollywood Boulevard" and "V. Thirteen" with the remixed versions that were released as a single.

Personnel
Credits are adapted from the No. 10, Upping St. liner notes.

Big Audio Dynamite
 Mick Jones — vocals; guitar; producer
 Don Letts	— vocals; effects
 Dan Donovan — keyboards; vocals; photography; artwork
 Leo Williams — bass; vocals
 Greg Roberts — drums; vocals
with:
 Joe Strummer — producer
 Matt Dillon — dialog
 Laurence Fishburne — dialog
 Sipho Josanna Johnson — human beatbox
 Adam "Flea" Newman — "dynamite"
 Sam Sever — remixing; drum programming
 Chep Nuñez — editing
 Alan Moulder, Cenzo Townshend, Dennis Mitchell — assistant editing
 Paul "Groucho" Smykle — engineer
 Mark "Spike" Stent — assistant
 Josh Cheuse — photography

The cover painting, based on a still taken from the Brian De Palma crime drama film Scarface (1983) was painted by Tim Jones.

References

External links
 

1986 albums
Big Audio Dynamite albums
Columbia Records albums
Albums recorded at Trident Studios